is Japanese voice actress and singer Maaya Uchida's debut single, released on April 23, 2014. The titular song from the single was used as the opening theme for the anime Riddle Story of Devil.

Track listings

Charts

Event 
 『 Maaya Party！Vol.1 』　Maaya Uchida 1st Single Release Event「Maaya Party！Vol.1」（May 3, 2014 - May 11, 2014：Tokyo, Aichi, Osaka）

Album

References

2014 debut singles
2014 songs
J-pop songs
Japanese-language songs
Pony Canyon singles
Anime songs